"European Son" is a song by the British band Japan.

The song was written by David Sylvian in 1978 following the band's US tour. It was intended to be the title track of Japan's third album and Sylvian intended to record it with disco producer Giorgio Moroder. However, this did not happen as Moroder preferred the song Life in Tokyo. Japan then recorded the song with Simon Napier-Bell and it was mixed by John Punter.

"European Son" was first released in Japan as the B-side of the single "I Second That Emotion" and on the Canadian Special Edition EP. In 1981 it was released as the B-side of the UK single "Life in Tokyo" and was included on the album Assemblage. In January 1982 a version remixed by Steve Nye was released as a single and became a hit on the UK Singles Chart, peaking at number 31.

Track listings
7": Hansa / HANSA 10 (UK)
European Son (Remix) – 3:48
Alien – 4:59

12": Hansa / HANSA 12-10 (UK)
European Son (Extended Remix) – 5:33
Alien – 4:59

Personnel 

 David Sylvian – lead vocals, guitar
 Richard Barbieri – synthesizers, keyboards
 Mick Karn – bass guitar, saxophone, vocals
 Rob Dean – guitar, vocals
 Steve Jansen – drums, percussion, vocals
 Steve Nye – remixing

References

1982 singles
Japan (band) songs
Songs written by David Sylvian
1982 songs
Hansa Records singles